Grant Buchanan is a former New Zealand Paralympic athlete. In the 1988 Summer Paralympics he won two gold medals in the discus throw and shot put.

References

External links 
 
 

Athletes (track and field) at the 1988 Summer Paralympics
Paralympic bronze medalists for New Zealand
Living people
Year of birth missing (living people)
Medalists at the 1988 Summer Paralympics
Paralympic medalists in athletics (track and field)
Paralympic athletes of New Zealand
New Zealand male discus throwers
New Zealand male shot putters
Wheelchair discus throwers
Wheelchair shot putters
Paralympic discus throwers
Paralympic shot putters